Alec Christopher Kessler (January 13, 1967 – October 13, 2007) was an American college basketball player for the University of Georgia and later, as a professional, for the Miami Heat in the National Basketball Association (NBA) and in the Italian league for Olimpia Stefanel Milano. After his basketball career ended, he became an orthopedic surgeon.

Career
Kessler played collegiately for the University of Georgia Bulldogs, where he was a three-time academic all-American first-team selection as well as the national academic all-American of the year in 1989 and 1990. Kessler left Georgia as the school's all-time leading scorer with 1,788 points (until the record was surpassed by Litterial Green).

The 6'11" power forward/center was selected 12th in the 1990 NBA Draft by the Houston Rockets, but his draft rights were immediately traded to the Miami Heat in exchange for the draft rights to Dave Jamerson and Carl Herrera.

Kessler made some news during the 1991 NBA Playoffs when he went missing for days in the Bahamas while checking on honeymoon spots with his fiancé. He had failed to check in with family members and it prompted a two-day search until he was found safe.

In his NBA career, he was a member of the Miami Heat for 210 games spanning four seasons until being waived on November 2, 1994, prior to the start of the 1994-95 season. He was played mostly as a backup center and held career averages of 5.2 points and 3.6 rebounds per game. He was still receiving $300,000 per annum from the Heat ten years after being cut.

After the NBA
After leaving the NBA, Kessler attended medical school at Emory University, graduating in 1999. He was an orthopedic surgeon in practice in Pensacola, Florida.

Kessler died after suffering a heart attack during a pick-up basketball game in Gulf Breeze, Florida on October 13, 2007. He was survived by his wife, Rhea, and two sons, Nickolas and Christopher.

Family
Kessler's brother, Chad, also played for the Georgia Bulldogs basketball team. Chad was drafted by the Los Angeles Clippers in the 5th round of the 1987 NBA Draft, but was cut in the pre-season. Chad's son, Houston Kessler, signed a letter of intent to play for the Bulldogs in the 2012–13 season.  Chad's other son Walker plays for the Utah Jazz.

References

External links
The Draft Review - Alec Kessler NBA Draft Profile
Basketball Reference: Alec Kessler

1967 births
2007 deaths
20th-century surgeons
All-American college men's basketball players
American expatriate basketball people in Italy
American men's basketball players
American orthopedic surgeons
Basketball players from Minneapolis
Centers (basketball)
Emory University School of Medicine alumni
Georgia Bulldogs basketball players
Houston Rockets draft picks
Miami Heat players
Power forwards (basketball)